Mount Albert Edward is the sixth highest peak on Vancouver Island and one of the most easily accessible. Located in Strathcona Provincial Park, the mountain is a popular destination both in summer for hikers and in winter for skiers and snowshoers. The mountain is named for Albert Edward, the Prince of Wales, later Edward VII.

See also
List of mountains in Strathcona Provincial Park

References

External links
Club Tread

Vancouver Island Ranges
Two-thousanders of British Columbia
Comox Land District